Jean-Baptiste Drouard de Bousset (1662 - 3 October 1725) was a French baroque composer.

He was born in Asnières, of minor nobility, and became maître de musique of the chapelle of the Louvre.  He died in Paris.

His son René Drouard de Bousset was a noted organist who also published two series of cantatas on biblical subjects.

Works, editions, recordings
Works
 Psaumes paraphrased by Elisabeth-Sophie Chéron (1648–1711), Ballard Paris.
Recordings
 Les Fastes De Bacchus, dir. Michel Verschaeve, La Compagnie Baroque. Arion
 Airs Sérieux, Elizabeth Dobbin, Le Jardin Secret. Fuga Libera (Outhere, 2016)

External links

References

1662 births
1725 deaths
French composers
French male composers